Telmatosaurus (meaning "marsh lizard") is a genus of basal hadrosauromorph dinosaur from the Late Cretaceous of Romania.

Discovery
 
In 1895 some peasants presented Ilona Nopcsa, the daughter of their lord, with a dinosaur skull they had found at the estate Săcele in the district Hunedoara (then named Hunyad) in Transylvania. Ilona had an elder brother, Ferenc or Franz Nopcsa von Felső-Szilvás who was inspired by the find to become a paleontology student at the University of Vienna. In 1899 Nopcsa named the skull Limnosaurus transsylvanicus. The generic name was derived from Greek λιμνή, limné, "swamp", a reference to the presumed swamp-dwelling habits of hadrosaurs. The specific name referred to Transylvania. Later Nopcsa discovered that the name Limnosaurus had already been used by Othniel Charles Marsh in 1872 for a crocodilian (later reclassified as Pristichampsus), so in 1903 Nopcsa renamed the genus  Telmatosaurus. Telma again means "marsh". In 1910 Barnum Brown, unaware of Nopcsa's replacement name, named the genus Hecatasaurus, but this is a junior objective synonym.

The holotype, BMNH B.3386, was found in the Haţeg Basin in a layer of the Sânpetru Formation dating from the Maastrichtian, about 68 million years old, at the time part of the Haţeg Island, one of the islands of the European Archipelago. It consists of a skull with lower jaws.

In 1915 Nopcsa referred his species to the genus Orthomerus, as an Orthomerus transsylvanicus. However, since the 1980s, Orthomerus has been considered a nomen dubium, leading to a revival of the name Telmatosaurus. Fragmentary hadrosauroid material from Spain, France and Germany, that had been referred to Orthomerus, is now often assigned to Telmatosaurus, but an identity is hard to prove; the same is also true of many Romanian fragments and eggs.

Paleobiology

Paleopathology 
 
A juvenile Telmatosaurus examined by Dumbrava et al. bears a large non-cancerous tumor called an ameloblastoma on its lower jaw. The presence of this benign tumor in a dinosaur is a first, as before the discovery, ameloblastomas were known only from modern mammals (including humans) and reptiles. The discovery of an ameloblastoma in a dinosaur gives evidence that the development of benign tumors is a basal characteristic, not just a relatively modern condition.

It is unlikely that the tumor caused the dinosaur any serious pain during its early stages of development, just as in humans with the same condition, but researchers can tell from its size that this particular dinosaur died before it reached adulthood. Since its preserved remains consist of only the two lower jaws, no one can ascertain its cause of death. The researchers were left wondering whether the presence of the ameloblastoma could have contributed to its death. From modern examples, it is well known that predators often target weak or injured individuals of the herd. The tumor in this dinosaur had not developed to its full extent at the moment it died, but it could have indirectly contributed to its early demise.

Diet 
Telmatosaurus dined on C3 plants, shrubs, herbaceous plants, leaves and seeds.

See also 

 Timeline of hadrosaur research

References 

Hadrosaurs
Maastrichtian life
Late Cretaceous dinosaurs of Europe
Cretaceous Romania
Fossils of Romania
Hațeg fauna
Fossil taxa described in 1903
Taxa named by Franz Nopcsa von Felső-Szilvás
Ornithischian genera